Milton Grigg (1905–1982) was a Virginia, USA, architect best known for his restoration work at Colonial Williamsburg and Monticello. In his career as an independent architect in Charlottesville, he worked as a modernist within the Jeffersonian tradition. K. Edward Lay, author of The Architecture of Jefferson County, called Grigg "one of the premier architectural restoration/preservationists of his time – always with an inquisitive mind on the forefront of architectural inquiry".

Biography
Grigg was born in Alexandria, Virginia. He studied architecture at the University of Virginia in the late-1920s. Between 1929 and 1933, he worked on restorations at Colonial Williamsburg. In 1933, he established his office in Charlottesville. Floyd Johnson was added as a partner in 1936. That partnership lasted until 1940, when Grigg associated with William Newton Hale, Jr.. By 1977, the firm was known as Grigg, Wood and Browne.

Notable works
 Beverley Hills Community United Methodist Church (Alexandria, Virginia)
Emmanuel Church (Greenwood, Virginia), Greenwood, Virginia
Ramsay (Greenwood, Virginia), Greenwood, Virginia
Braddock Street United Methodist Church (Winchester, Virginia)
Marquis Memorial United Methodist Church (Staunton, Virginia)
Hollymead, restoration , 1937, (Charlottesville, Virginia)
Edgemont (Covesville, Virginia), renovation, 1948
Moorefield Presbyterian Church, renovation, 1964, (Moorefield, West Virginia)
Delta Tau Delta Founders House, renovation, 1970s, (Bethany, West Virginia)
The Valley Road Cottage, 1937, (Charlottesville, VA)
Heritage Baptist Church, 1970, (Annapolis, Maryland)

References

External links
 Grigg at Monticello

Further reading
Lasala, Joseph Michael (2009), "The curriculum vitae of a classicist", Magazine of Albemarle County History, 67, 14–51. (Overview of Grigg's life and career.)

1905 births
1982 deaths
20th-century American architects